Vadym Hetman (born July 14, 1987) is a Ukrainian footballer who played as a defender.

Playing career 
Hetman began his professional career in 2004 in the Ukrainian Second League with FC Enerhiya Yuzhnoukrainsk. He later played with MFC Kremin Kremenchuk, FC Ros Bila Tserkva, and Desna Chernihiv. In 2011, he played in the Ukrainian First League with FC Nyva Vinnytsia, and the following season returned to the Ukrainian Second League to play with Desna Chernihiv, and FC Arsenal Bila Tserkva. In 2016, he featured once more in the Ukrainian First League with FC Arsenal Kyiv. In 2018, he played abroad in the Canadian Soccer League with FC Ukraine United. In his debut season in Toronto he assisted in securing the First Division title.

References  

1987 births
Living people
Ukrainian footballers
FC Enerhiya Yuzhnoukrainsk players
FC Kremin Kremenchuk players
FC Ros Bila Tserkva players
FC Desna Chernihiv players
FC Nyva Vinnytsia players
FC Arsenal-Kyivshchyna Bila Tserkva players
FC Arsenal Kyiv players
FC Ukraine United players
Ukrainian First League players
Canadian Soccer League (1998–present) players
Association football defenders